Mount Ashland is the highest peak in the Siskiyou Mountains of southern Oregon. The Siskiyou Mountains are a subrange of the Klamath Mountains in northwestern California and southwestern Oregon. The mountain is part of the Rogue River–Siskiyou National Forest, which encompasses most of the Siskiyou Mountains.

Geology 
Mount Ashland is composed largely of granite, with other igneous intrusive rocks like diorite and granodiorite. The peak and its surrounding flanks make up the Mount Ashland pluton.

Recreation 
Mount Ashland Ski Area, located on the mountain, features 23 trails on  served by four lifts.

References

External links 

 

Klamath Mountains
Mountains of Oregon
Mountains of Jackson County, Oregon
North American 2000 m summits